is a Japanese former sports shooter. He competed in the 50 metre rifle, prone event at the 1964 Summer Olympics.

References

1942 births
Living people
Japanese male sport shooters
Olympic shooters of Japan
Shooters at the 1964 Summer Olympics
Place of birth missing (living people)
20th-century Japanese people